AirCars is a 1997 shooter video game developed by MidNite Entertainment Group, published in North America by ICD and in France by La Terre du Milieu for the Atari Jaguar. It was one of the last officially licensed releases for the platform. The game follows a government pilot controlling an aircar to stop the E.B.N.E.R.S. organization, which plans to dominate a post-apocalyptic world left by a nuclear holocaust. The player fights against enemies and bosses, while shooting down key targets across 32 missions set on various locations. Two players can also play the main campaign or up to eight players can participate in a deathmatch mode.

Originally announced in 1994, AirCars was one of the first titles in development for the Jaguar by MidNite Entertainment, one of the initial third-party developers signed by Atari Corporation for the platform. It was also one of the first games to support local area network (LAN) play using the CatBox, an unofficial peripheral by Black Cat Design and ICD. Although the CatBox accessory launched in mid-1995, the game's release was held up by MidNite due to a less than enthusiastic response from press and the company facing financial difficulties before publishing duties were handled by ICD instead, who produced a limited run of copies in total as a result.

AirCars garnered generally unfavorable reviews from journalists before the planned initial launch was held up and after its release to the market; criticism was directed towards the presentation, visuals, sound, and gameplay. Some complemented its multiplayer capabilities with the CatBox, but the setup required before playing was also criticized. It has been retrospectively cited as one of the worst video games of all time.

Gameplay 

AirCars is a three-dimensional shooter game that is primarily played from a first-person perspective. The plot involves an organization named E.B.N.E.R.S., which was established after a nuclear holocaust left the world in a post-apocalyptic state. Their goal was to encourage mankind to live peacefully and restructure society to eradicate any hostility but it was deemed unrealistic, with E.B.N.E.R.S. later becoming known as a fringe organization of radical scientists. The government placed spies into the organization to follow their activities, learning about their recent development of teleportation devices, force fields and nuclear-powered vehicles called aircar, which unveiled E.B.N.E.R.S. plans to dominate the world by using their weapons and technology to submit the remaining humans under their rule. The government sends a pilot to command their own version of the aircar to eliminate the organization. There are three difficulty levels the player can select at the main menu before starting a game.

The main objective of the game is to obliterate E.B.N.E.R.S. by destroying key targets in an area such as bases, complexes, and installations, which are identified before the start of each mission at the briefing screen. Every primary target must be eliminated before exiting the area via a teleportation gate and proceeding into the next area. The player also fights against enemies and bosses in order to progress further. There are 32 missions in total, each one taking place across various locations. Though primarily played in a first-person view, the player can change between multiple camera angles by pressing the assigned button on the controller's keypad to view their surroundings. Although the player can explore at their own pace, a red line is put into the edge of the area to limit exploration beyond the main playfield. At the beginning, the player starts off with a cannon and shotgun as main weapons, which are interchangeable with other weapons obtained by destroying enemies scattered on the playfield and attach them either to the left or right of their aircar by pushing the corresponding buttons on the keypad.

The vehicle is also equipped with smoke screens and mines as subweapons that can be used via the keypad. The player can perform strafing by holding one of the action buttons on the controller as well. There are two types of power-ups scattered around the map that players can acquire, with one being used the moment when they are picked up and the other being stored for later use. The game features unlimited lives; if the player's current aircar unit is destroyed, they are immediately sent and placed into a new one but with a penalty of losing all weaponry and power-ups obtained. The map radar inside the player's vehicle displays the location of targets and power-ups, while keeping track of how much of the playfield is revealed. Teleporters are also placed on the playfield, which warps the player from one location of the map into another depending on their color. Two players can play the main campaign using JagLink or up to eight players can participate in a deathmatch mode via local area network (LAN) play using CatBox.

Development and release 
AirCars was one of the first titles in development for the Atari Jaguar by MidNite Entertainment Group, one of the initial third-party developers signed by Atari Corporation for the platform. MidNite Entertainment had previously worked on conversions for the Atari 8-bit family, Atari ST, and Atari Lynx such as Food Fight, Airball, an adaptation based on the 1988 high fantasy adventure film Willow, Hard Drivin', and Ninja Gaiden III: The Ancient Ship of Doom. The game was programmed by John Sanderson, with Richard Ebner handling the sound and John McNulty being responsible for the artwork, in addition of other staff members within MidNite collaborating in its creation process. It became one of the first games to support the CatBox, an unofficial multimedia peripheral announced as a joint project between Black Cat Design and ICD, which enabled local area network (LAN) play with other Jaguar consoles. The game was originally revealed in 1994 under the name Car Wars in the January 1994 issue of online magazine Atari Explorer Online and initially listed for a vague 1994 launch, while the CatBox peripheral was slated to be released early in the Jaguar's life, in the second quarter of that same year. Its final title, AirCars, was later unveiled and the game was also featured in a promotional recording sent by Atari to video game retail stores on November 14, being advertised with a December 1994 launch window. 

The game was later delayed but was showcased to attendees at the 1995 Winter Consumer Electronics Show, with a European release planned by Telegames as well. Although the game itself was not available on the showfloor, the CatBox was demonstrated along with BattleSphere  at E3 1995 by ICD co-founder Tom Harker, who was also a co-designer at 4Play. The CatBox released in mid-1995, however the game's release was held up at the last minute by MidNite due to a less than enthusiastic response from press and the company facing financial difficulties, leaving AirCars unpublished despite being completed, passing certification and listed with a July 1995 release date. It was also MidNite's only completed project for the Jaguar, as the company had two more releases planned: the arcade-style action strategy game Assault: Covert Ops and the 3D fantasy dungeon crawling role-playing game Dungeon Depths, the latter of which was intended to feature support for up to eight players via CatBox. Both titles were announced in 1994 and scheduled for launch in the second quarter of 1995, but neither were released. A year later, the game's trademark was abandoned.

ICD eventually acquired the rights to AirCars and published the game on June 18, 1997, as a limited run of 200 copies. Each copy came in a standard cartridge with a full color label shrinkwrapped on a box insert without an outer box, accompanied with a manual containing a printed representation of the game's control overlay. It was also distributed in France by La Terre du Milieu. Due to its very limited production run, copies of the game are sought-after by collectors and commands high prices on the secondary game collecting market. In 2010, an early prototype was released under the title AirCars '94, produced in low numbers by AtariAge community member Gary "Gaztee" Taylor with permission from game collector and owner Marco Pasquali. That same year, the group Team Jaguar discovered an unreleased version of the game dubbed KA AirCars, which was sent to the ESRB for evaluation, producing and releasing a limited run of 100 copies packaged in a clamshell case. This version has a number of differences with the original version such as day and night missions, a smaller dashboard, new explosion animations with debris that can damage the player at close range, and new sound effects. In 2016, a second print run was produced and released by Beta Phase Games in conjunction with B&C Computervisions.

Reception 

AirCars garnered generally unfavorable reviews from gaming journalists before the game's planned initial launch was held up and after its release to the market. Electronic Gaming Monthlys four reviewers panned the poor visuals, limited action, audio, and unrefined controls. They felt that the multiplayer component was its only redeeming quality. Video Gamess Robert Zengerle agreed with EGM regarding the graphics and audio. However, Zengerle favorably compared its gameplay with Starglider and highlighted the multiplayer link-up option using CatBox, commenting that the title is worthwhile for two or more player but not in single-player. 

In contrast, VideoGames magazine lambasted its overall audiovisual presentation and playability, stating that "This game is excruciating to play; even the multi-player link capabilities aren't enough to save it." Game Playerss Patrick Baggatta criticized the polygonal graphics for their simple look and monocromatic landscapes, minimalistic and generic music, and gameplay for its lack of sophistication and strategy. Baggatta gave a positive remark to the eight-player network feature but saw its hardware requirements as a negative point. Next Generation noted the hovercraft's fluid and semi-realistic feeling of motion, but concurred with Baggatta in relation to the environment necessary for multiplayer. They wrote that "Aircars is a good attempt in many ways, but it doesn't quite make the grade in a few vital categories, including, most notably, graphics – which are extremely simplistic and lacking in any particular variety." 

British publication Ultimate Future Games was appalled by its visuals, labelling them as "atrocious" and unfavorably comparing it with Cybermorph. GamePros Tommy Glide criticized the graphics for the sparse surroundings, bland enemies and background scenery. Glide noted the sound was below average but felt that its "good" control made the game bearable, which was compared with Spectre (1991). Writing for Atari Gaming Headquarters, Carl Forhan disagreed with the other reviewers and regarded it to be an enjoyable title in its genre, commending its smooth controls, enemy AI, variety of weapons, lack of pop-up in the terrain, and networking features. Nevertheless, Forhan saw the sporadic missions, difficulty, very minimal texture-mapping, and repetitive sound effects as negative aspects. Pascal Berrocal of the French ST Magazine concurred with Forhan on most points, but ultimately criticized the simplistic visuals and music. Author Andy Slaven regarded it as the worst 3D shooter on the Jaguar. Writer Seanbaby placed AirCars as number 13 in his "20 worst games of all time" feature. Heiko Poppen of German website neXGam also gave the title a negative retrospective outlook.

Notes

References

External links 

 
 AirCars at AtariAge
 AirCars at GameFAQs
 AirCars at MobyGames

1997 video games
Anti-war video games
Atari Jaguar games
Atari Jaguar-only games
Cooperative video games
MidNite Software games
Multiplayer and single-player video games
Post-apocalyptic video games
Science fiction video games
Shooter video games
Video games developed in the United States
Video games set in the future